Pat Bingham (born October 8, 1968) is a Canadian former professional ice hockey defenceman. He is currently the president of the Colorado Rampage in the Midwest Elite Hockey League.

Bingham retired as a player in 1996 following a seven-year professional career that included time in the American Hockey League, ECHL, Colonial Hockey League, Sunshine Hockey League, and Southern Hockey League.

Bingham first head coaching position was during the 1999–2000 season with the Huntsville Channel Cats of the Central Hockey League. He has since gained head coaching experience in the United Hockey League, ECHL, and American Hockey League. In the ECHL he won the John Brophy Award as the Coach of the Year for stearing the Wheeling Nailers to a 51-17-4 record during the 2003–04 season.

On September 8, 2012, Bingham announced he was retiring as head coach of the ECHL's Elmira Jackals, and he was introduced as the new head coach for the Colorado Rampage of the U16 AAA Midwest Elite Hockey League.

Career statistics

Awards and honours

References

External links

1968 births
Living people
Binghamton Whalers players
Brantford Smoke players
Canadian ice hockey coaches
Canadian ice hockey defencemen
Hampton Roads Admirals players
Jacksonville Bullets players
Kamloops Blazers players
Lakeland Prowlers players
Nashville Knights players
New Westminster Bruins players
Richmond Renegades players
Ice hockey people from Vancouver
Canadian expatriate ice hockey players in the United States